"Home of the Blues" is a song co-written and recorded by American country music artist Johnny Cash. The song was recorded on July 1, 1957 in Memphis, Tennessee, and was released as a single in August the same year. It was also included as the eleventh track of his second album, Sings the Songs That Made Him Famous.

The song was written by Johnny Cash, Lillie McAlpin and Glenn Douglas Tubb and produced by Jack Clement.

Partial ownership of the song is held by Florida businessman John Palumbo.

Cover versions of the song were recorded by Dwight Yoakam in 1988, by Laughing Hyenas in 1995 and by Owl City in early 2012. The song was also recorded by Joaquin Phoenix for the 2005 film Walk the Line.

Content
The song is an autobiography of Cash's unpleasant childhood.

Chart positions

References

1957 songs
1957 singles
Johnny Cash songs
Rock-and-roll songs
Rockabilly songs
Songs written by Johnny Cash
Sun Records singles
Songs about childhood
Songs written by Glenn Douglas Tubb